Predrag Mirčeta (Serbian Cyrillic: Предраг Мирчета; born 2 February 1984) is a Serbian footballer.

He had previously played with Serbian clubs RFK Grafičar Beograd, FK Jedinstvo Surčin, Austrian FC Oslip, back in Serbia with FK Hajduk Beograd, on loan at Albanian FK Apolonia Fier, Serbian FK Zmaj Zemun, Greek Aias Salamina F.C., Hungarian Vecsési FC, FK Dinamo Vranje and FK Balkan Mirijevo and i Maltese Mosta FC.

References

External links
 Predrag Mirčeta at Srbijafudbal
 
 Profile at Aias official site

1984 births
Living people
Serbian footballers
Association football midfielders
FK Hajduk Beograd players
Serbian expatriate footballers
Expatriate footballers in Austria
Expatriate footballers in Albania
KF Apolonia Fier players
Serbian expatriate sportspeople in Albania
Expatriate footballers in Greece
Aias Salamina F.C. players
Expatriate footballers in Hungary
FK Dinamo Vranje players